Randhir Yasendra Witana, known simply as Randhir, is a Sri Lankan rapper and songwriter.

Background 
Randhir was educated at Royal College, Colombo.

Beginnings 
Randhir began his professional music career as a member of the first hip hop music group of Sri Lanka, Brown Boogie Nation. Later he collaborated with Sri Lankan hip hop duo BnS, featuring on their first hip hop remix song "Siri Sangabodhi". In the early years of his career, Randhir collaborated with many popular young Sri Lankan artists, notably BnS featuring as a hip hop artist on many of the duo's 'folkhop remixes'.

Success with debut song "Namal Mitak"
In 2013, Randhir released his debut song "Namal Mitak". It was composed by Randhir and produced by Sachith Peiris. The release of "Namal Mitak" marked Randhir's entry into the Sri Lankan music industry as a solo artist and won him much acclaim among music lovers of all ages. The song topped many Sri Lankan radio charts while video recordings of his live performances were given heavy rotation on many Sri Lankan TV channels.

Namal Mitak - The Album 
Randhir released his debut solo album "Namal Mitak" on 23 September 2013, through Universal Music & M Entertainments. The release of a music video for "Ojaye" (which was another popular hit song) followed soon after the release of the album. The music video for "Ojaye" was awarded the prize for the best choreography at the Derana Music Video Awards 2013.

Ambassadorship 
In August 2013, Randhir represented Sri Lanka as the country's Hip hop music Ambassador at the C/O POP Music Festival in Cologne, Germany.

In November–December 2013, Randhir volunteered to be the spokesperson for an AIDS Awareness Campaign by the National STD & AIDS Control Program [NSACP] of Sri Lanka. On 10 December 2013, Randhir received an award from the NSACP in recognition of his contribution towards AIDS prevention in Sri Lanka.

Discography 
Studio Albums
 Namal Mitak (2013)
Pem wasanthaya

References

Sri Lankan rappers
Living people
Alumni of Royal College, Colombo
Year of birth missing (living people)